Qi Shi (born October 1970), born Shen Jun, is a Chinese billionaire businessman, founder of East Money Information a financial and stock information website provider, with 23.6 million users a day in July 2015.

He has a bachelor's degree from Shanghai Jiaotong University and an executive MBA from Fudan University.

As of August 2020, Forbes estimated his net worth at US$7.7 billion.

He lives in Shanghai.

References

1970 births
Living people
Chinese businesspeople
Billionaires from Shanghai
Chinese company founders
Shanghai Jiao Tong University alumni
Fudan University alumni
Businesspeople in financial services sector